This Old House is an American home improvement media brand with television shows, a magazine and a website, ThisOldHouse.com. The brand is headquartered in Stamford, CT. The television series airs on the American television station Public Broadcasting Service (PBS) and follows remodeling projects of houses over a number of weeks. This Old House is produced by This Old House Ventures, Inc. with WGBH Boston as the PBS distributing station. Warner Bros. Domestic Television distributes the series to commercial television stations in syndication. Time Inc. launched This Old House magazine in 1995, focusing on home how-to, know-how and inspiration.
Series overviewSeasons: 
References
External links

Series overview

Note: Episodes are listed in the original broadcast order

 List of This Old House episodes (seasons 1–10)
 List of This Old House episodes (seasons 11–20)
 List of This Old House episodes (seasons 21–30)
 List of This Old House episodes (seasons 31–40)

Season 41 (2019–2020)
Kevin O'Connor's seventeenth season as the host.
Starting with this season, This Old House is now produced by WETA-TV in Washington, D.C.

Season 42 (2020–2021)
Kevin O'Connor's eighteenth season as the host.

Season 43 (2021–2022)
Kevin O'Connor's nineteenth season as the host.

Season 44 (2022–2023)
Kevin O'Connor's twentieth season as the host.
First season without Norm Abram.

References

External links

This Old House at cptv.org

This Old House